Wallace Hashim Chambers (May 15, 1951September 22, 2019) was an American professional football player who was a defensive lineman in the National Football League (NFL). He was a defensive tackle for the Chicago Bears and defensive end for the Tampa Bay Buccaneers in the 1970s.  He was selected with the eighth overall pick by the Bears in the 1973 NFL Draft out of Eastern Kentucky University, and played previous to that for Mount Clemens High School, where he graduated in 1969.

College
Chambers attended Eastern Kentucky University.

Professional career
Chambers was chosen as the NFL Defensive Rookie of the Year following the 1973 NFL season and was selected to play in the Pro Bowl three times (1973, 1975 and 1976). Chambers was named All-Pro following the 1976 campaign, 1976 NFL linemen of the year, NFC defensive player of the year (1975 and 1976) and also garnered second-team All-Pro honors in 1973, 1974 and 1975.

Coaching career
Following his playing career Chambers coached at the University of Northern Iowa, at East Carolina University, and for the New York Jets.

In 1989 Chambers was a defensive coach for the New York Jets under Joe Walton. He then served as the defensive line coach for the WLAF's Ohio Glory in their sole season in 1992 under head coach Larry Little.

Personal life
Chambers had trouble standing up during the last 10 years of his life due to knee and back problems and spent a great deal of his time in a wheel chair or using a walker. He lived in Saginaw, Michigan with his wife Patsy Chambers.

Chambers died on September 22, 2019 at the age of 68.

References

1951 births
2019 deaths
American football defensive ends
American football defensive tackles
Chicago Bears players
East Carolina Pirates football coaches
Eastern Kentucky Colonels football players
Ohio Glory coaches
New York Jets coaches
Northern Iowa Panthers football coaches
Tampa Bay Buccaneers players
National Conference Pro Bowl players
National Football League Defensive Rookie of the Year Award winners
Sportspeople from Columbus, Georgia
Players of American football from Columbus, Georgia
People from Phenix City, Alabama
Brian Piccolo Award winners